The Battle of Castle Itter was fought on 5 May 1945, in the Austrian village of Itter in the North Tyrol region of the country, during the last days of the European Theater of World War II.

Troops of the 23rd Tank Battalion of the 12th Armored Division of the US XXI Corps led by Captain John C. "Jack" Lee, Jr., a number of Wehrmacht soldiers led by Major Josef "Sepp" Gangl, SS-Hauptsturmführer Kurt-Siegfried Schrader, and recently freed French prisoners of war defended Castle Itter against an attacking force from the 17th SS Panzergrenadier Division until relief from the American 142nd Infantry Regiment of the 36th Division of XXI Corps arrived.

The French prisoners included former prime ministers, generals, tennis star Jean Borotra, and Charles de Gaulle's sister. It is one of two known times during the war in which Americans and Germans fought side by side, the other being Operation Cowboy. Popular accounts of the battle have called it the strangest battle of World War II.

Background 
Itter Castle is a small castle on a hill near the village of Itter in Austria. After the 1938 Anschluss, the German government officially leased the castle in late 1940 from its owner, Franz Grüner.

The castle was seized from Grüner by SS Lieutenant General Oswald Pohl under the orders of Heinrich Himmler on 7 February 1943. The transformation of the castle into a prison was completed by 25 April 1943, and the facility was placed under the administration of the Dachau concentration camp.

The prison was established to contain high-profile French prisoners valuable to the Reich. Notable prisoners included tennis player Jean Borotra, former prime ministers Édouard Daladier and Paul Reynaud, former commanders-in-chief Maxime Weygand and Maurice Gamelin, Charles de Gaulle's elder sister Marie-Agnès Cailliau, right-wing leader and closet French resistance member François de La Rocque, and trade union leader Léon Jouhaux. Besides the VIP prisoners, the castle held a number of Eastern European prisoners detached from Dachau, who were used for maintenance and other menial work.

Prelude 

On 3 May 1945, Zvonimir Čučković, an imprisoned Yugoslav communist resistance member from Croatia who worked as a handyman at the prison, left the castle under the pretext of performing an errand for the prison's commander Sebastian Wimmer. Čučković carried with him a letter in English seeking Allied assistance which he was to give to the first American he encountered.

The town of Wörgl was  down the mountains but was still occupied by German troops.  Čučković instead pressed on up the Inn River valley towards Innsbruck  distant.  Late that evening, he reached the outskirts of the city and encountered an advance party of the 409th Infantry Regiment of the American 103rd Infantry Division of the US VI Corps and informed them of the castle's prisoners.

At dawn, a heavily armored rescue was mounted but was stopped by heavy shelling just past Jenbach around halfway to Itter, then recalled by superiors for encroaching into territory of the U.S. 36th Division to the east. Only two jeeps of auxiliary personnel continued.
When Čučković failed to return, and the former commander of Dachau Eduard Weiter died in suspicious circumstances at the castle on 2 May, Wimmer feared for his own life and abandoned his post. The SS-Totenkopfverbände guards left the castle soon after, and the prisoners took control of the castle and armed themselves with the weapons that remained, however they feared an attack by any roaming parties of SS men still loyal to the Nazi regime.

Failing to learn of the result of Čučković's effort, prison leaders accepted the offer of its Czech cook, Andreas Krobot, to bicycle to Wörgl mid-day on 4 May in hopes of reaching help there. Armed with a similar note, he succeeded in contacting Austrian resistance in Wörgl which had recently been abandoned by Wehrmacht forces but reoccupied by roaming Waffen-SS troops. He was taken to Major Josef Gangl, commander of the remains of a unit of Wehrmacht soldiers who had defied an order to retreat and instead thrown in with the local resistance, led by Rupert Hagleitner.

Gangl sought to maintain his unit's position in the town to protect local residents from SS reprisals. Nazi loyalists would shoot at any window displaying either a white flag or an Austrian flag, and would summarily execute males as possible deserters. Gangl's hopes were pinned on the Americans reaching Wörgl promptly so he could surrender to them. Instead, he would now have to approach them under a white flag to ask for their help.

Around the same time, a reconnaissance unit of four Sherman tanks of the 23rd Tank Battalion, 12th Armored Division of the US XXI Corps, under the command of Captain Lee, had reached Kufstein, Austria,  to the north. There, in the town square, it idled while waiting for the 12th to be relieved by the 36th Infantry Division. Asked to provide relief by Gangl, Lee did not hesitate, volunteering to lead the rescue mission and immediately earning permission from his HQ.

After a personal reconnaissance of the Castle with Gangl and Hagleitner, in the major's Kübelwagen, Lee left two of his tanks behind but requisitioned five more and supporting infantry from the recently arrived 142nd Infantry Regiment of the 36th.

En route, Lee was forced to send the reinforcements back when a bridge proved too flimsy for the entire column to cross once, let alone twice. Leaving one of his tanks behind to guard it, he set back off accompanied only by 14 American soldiers, Gangl, and a driver, and a truck carrying ten former German artillerymen.  from the castle, they defeated a party of SS troops that had been attempting to set up a roadblock.

Meanwhile, the French prisoners had asked an SS officer, Kurt-Siegfried Schrader, whom they had befriended in Itter during his convalescence from wounds and was living locally, to take charge of their defense. When Lee arrived at the castle, prisoners greeted the rescuing force warmly but were disappointed at its small size. Lee placed the men under his command in defensive positions around the castle and positioned his Sherman tank, Besotten Jenny, at the main entrance.

Battle 

Shortly after the arrival of the reinforcements, a force of 100–150 Waffen-SS soldiers led by Georg Bochmann, who had been occupying some hills near the town, decided to launch an attack. Lee had ordered the French prisoners to hide, but they remained outside and fought alongside the American and Wehrmacht soldiers. Throughout the night, the defenders were harried by a reconnaissance force sent to assess their strength and probe the fortress for weaknesses. Before the main assault began, Gangl was able to phone Alois Mayr, the Austrian resistance leader in Wörgl, and ask for reinforcements. Only two more German soldiers under his command and a teenage Austrian resistance member, Hans Waltl, could be spared, and they quickly drove to the castle. 

On the morning of 5 May the attack began. The Sherman tank provided machine-gun fire support until it was destroyed by German fire from an 88 mm gun; it was occupied at the time only by a radioman seeking to repair the tank's faulty radio; he escaped without injury.

Meanwhile, by early afternoon, word had finally reached the 142nd of the desperation of the defenders' plight, and a relief force was dispatched. Aware that he had been unable to give the 142nd complete information on the enemy and its disposition before communications had been severed, Lee accepted Borotra's (tennis star) offer to vault the castle wall and run the gauntlet of SS strongpoints and ambushes to deliver it. The tennis star was recognized by René Lévesque, a French Canadian reporter embedded with the 142nd and later Premier of Quebec. Borotra asked for an American military uniform, then joined the force as it made haste to reach the prison before its defenders fired their last rounds of ammunition.

The relief force arrived around 16:00, and the SS were promptly defeated. Some 100 SS prisoners were reportedly taken. The French prisoners were evacuated towards France that evening, reaching Paris on 10 May.

Aftermath and historical significance 

For his service defending the castle, Lee received the Distinguished Service Cross.

Gangl died during the battle from a sniper rifle bullet while trying to move former French Prime Minister Paul Reynaud out of harm's way, and was honored as an Austrian national hero; a street in Wörgl was named after him. He was the sole defender to die during the battle, though four others were wounded. Popular accounts of the battle have dubbed it the strangest battle of World War II. The battle was fought five days after Adolf Hitler had committed suicide and only two days before the signing of Germany's unconditional surrender.

References

Citations

Sources

External links 

 
 
 
YouTube video "When Americans and Wehrmacht allied against the SS – Castle Itter 1945"

1945 in Austria
Austria in World War II
Battles and operations of World War II involving France
Battles of World War II involving Germany
Last stands
Battles and operations of World War II involving the United States
Conflicts in 1945
Western European Campaign (1944–1945)
May 1945 events